Robert Griesemer (born 1964) is a Swiss computer scientist. He is best known for his work on the Go programming language. Prior to Go, he worked on Google's V8 JavaScript engine, the Sawzall language, the Java HotSpot virtual machine, and the Strongtalk system.

Background 

Robert Griesemer studied at the ETH Zurich, where he did his doctorate under the supervision of Hanspeter Mössenböck and Niklaus Wirth on the subject of a programming language for vector computers. He works at Google.

Papers 
 Robert Griesemer, Srdjan Mitrovic, A Compiler for the Java HotSpot Virtual Machine, The School of Niklaus Wirth (2000), pp. 133–152  
 Tushar Deepak Chandra, Robert Griesemer, Joshua Redstone, Paxos Made Live - An Engineering Perspective (2006 Invited Talk), Proceedings of the 26th Annual ACM Symposium on Principles of Distributed Computing, ACM press (2007)

Patents 
 Interpreting functions utilizing a hybrid of virtual and native machine instructions
 Method and apparatus for dynamically optimizing byte-coded programs
 Apparatus and method for uniformly performing comparison operations on long word operands

See also 
 Rob Pike
 Ken Thompson
Brian Kernighan

References

External links
 Video: Google I/O 2012 - Meet the Go Team
 Video: GopherCon 2015: Robert Griesemer - The Evolution of Go

Programming language designers
Swiss computer scientists
1964 births
Living people